Ngaygungu (also known as Ngȋ-koong-ō) is a sleeping, Australian Aboriginal language  originally spoken by the Ngaygungyi, for which a wordlist was recorded from Atherton in the Wet Tropics of Queensland by Walter Edmund Roth in October 1898, later also recorded by Norman Barnett Tindale in 1938, but no longer spoken by any living speakers.

Phonology

Vowels 

Ngȋ-koong-ō has the following vowels

each pronounced as in English were the English vowels a, e, i, o  to be marked for length.

Consonants 
Ngȋ-koong-ō has twelve consonants as follows:

each pronounced as they would be in English.

See also 
 Ngaygungu people

References

Maric languages
Extinct languages of Queensland
Unclassified languages of Australia